Hillsdale College is a private conservative Christian liberal arts college in Hillsdale, Michigan. It was founded in 1844 by members of the Free Will Baptists.

Its mission statement says that liberal arts curriculum is based on Western heritage as a product of Greco-Roman culture and Christian tradition. The required core curriculum has courses on the Great Books, the U.S. Constitution, biology, chemistry, and physics.

Since the late 20th century, in order to opt out of the US government's Title IX anti-discrimination requirements, Hillsdale has been among a small number of U.S. colleges to decline governmental financial support. Instead, Hillsdale depends entirely on private donations to supplement students' tuition.

History

Founding

In August 1844, members of the local community of Free Will Baptists resolved to organize their denomination's first collegiate institution. After gathering donations, they established Michigan Central College in Spring Arbor, Michigan, on December 4, 1844. That site is now home to Spring Arbor University. Although religiously affiliated, the college was officially nonsectarian.

Under its first president, Daniel McBride Graham, who held the office from 1844 to 1848, Michigan Central College opened within a two-room store and admitted five students. In March 1845, the government of Michigan incorporated the college, and the college enrolled 25 undergraduates by the end of its first year.

Edmund Burke Fairfield assumed the presidency of Michigan Central College in 1848. On March 20, 1850, the Michigan legislature granted the college a special charter, giving it the right to confer degrees. Black students were admitted immediately after the college's founding, and the college became the second school in the nation to grant four-year liberal arts degrees to women.

Outgrowing its space, in 1853 the school moved to Hillsdale, Michigan, in part to have access to the railroad that served the city. It received considerable financial support from local citizens, who wanted to develop the 20-year-old town. The cornerstone of the new building, Central Hall, was laid on July 4, 1853. After Michigan Central College completed construction and moved, it reopened as Hillsdale College on November 7, 1855.

Fairfield led Hillsdale from 1848 to 1869. In 1854, he attended the first Republican Party convention with Ransom Dunn in neighboring Jackson, Michigan. A prominent leader, Fairfield attended the first Republican Party convention in 1856, and was elected lieutenant governor of Michigan. Hillsdale's early anti-slavery reputation and pivotal role in founding the Republican Party led to the invitation of several notable speakers on the campus, including Frederick Douglass (who visited the school on two separate occasions) and Edward Everett, the orator preceding Abraham Lincoln at Gettysburg. On August 8, 1860, Hillsdale conferred its first degrees. On March 20, 1863, the Michigan legislature formally legalized Hillsdale's change of name and location.

Hillsdale no longer has any denominational affiliation but, according to its website, "the moral tenets of Christianity as commonly understood in the Christian tradition have been essential to the mission of the College". It has always been open to black and female students.

19th century

In 1861, many Hillsdale students joined the ranks of the Union Army during the American Civil War; a higher percentage of Hillsdale students enlisted than from any other Michigan college.

Hillsdale survived while nearly 80% of the colleges founded before the Civil War were forced to close. After the war, it regained its normal enrollment; many veterans returned and completed their education. Hillsdale continued to host notable speakers, including the physician and educator Sophia Jex-Blake in October 1865. Hillsdale's Delta Tau Delta chapter, its first fraternity, was chartered on October 19, 1867.

In 1869, James Calder succeeded Fairfield as president. Calder served through 1871. During his administration, the commercial school opened, a theological department was established, and the college enrolled around 750 students. He resigned to become president of Pennsylvania State University.

Hillsdale's first president, Daniel McBride Graham, returned for a brief second term in 1871, notably rebuilding the campus after the catastrophic "Great Fire" of March 6, 1874. DeWitt Clinton Durgin, a Union College alumnus, was president from 1874 to 1884. In 1878, the Hillsdale Herald was published, becoming the second oldest college newspaper in Michigan, behind Kalamazoo College's The Index. This paper later merged with another college paper to become The Collegian. During Durgin's presidency, Hillsdale's Kappa Kappa Gamma and Sigma Chi chapters were chartered.

After Ransom Dunn's brief turn as acting president, George F. Mosher served as president of Hillsdale from 1886 to 1901. During this time, the college grew in size and prestige. In 1884, Spencer O. Fisher became the first Hillsdale alumnus elected to Congress. Pi Beta Phi and Alpha Tau Omega were chartered. In 1891, the Chicago Herald reported, "Hillsdale has a college second in standing to no denominational college in the country." Four years later, when the University of Chicago offered to affiliate with Hillsdale, the college rejected the proposal.

20th century

thumb|left|Central Hall in 1908
In 1900, Hillsdale ceased grazing livestock and removed the agrarian fence circling the campus. It began an era of institutional growth and professionalization. In 1902, Joseph William Mauck became the college's sixth president, the first Hillsdale graduate to return as president of his alma mater. Beloved by the college community and an early and outspoken advocate for women's suffrage, Mauck served for two decades. One of the women's dormitories is named after Mauck.

In 1907, the college amended its Articles of Association, no longer requiring the president and trustees to be Free Will Baptists. This led to a decline in the theological department's prestige but an increase in the number of Christian denominations represented on campus.

William Gear Spencer succeeded Mauck as president, serving from 1922 to 1932, when he departed to lead Franklin College. Under Spencer, Hillsdale acquired its 14-acre Slayton Arboretum, built new dormitories, constructed a new field house for its developing athletic programs, and, in 1924, chartered its chapter of Chi Omega.

During the Great Depression, Willfred Otto Mauck, Joseph Mauck's son and also an alumnus, was selected as the eighth president, serving from 1933 to 1942. Throughout this era, the college struggled financially, was forced to cancel its new construction projects, and cut the pay of its faculty and staff by nearly 20%. Succeeding Mauck, Harvey L. Turner became Hillsdale's ninth president, serving from 1942 to 1952. Despite its financial difficulties, the college built a new library, had an undefeated and untied football team in 1938, and celebrated its centennial in 1944, when more than 1,000 alumni returned to campus for the commencement ceremony.

J. Donald Phillips next assumed the presidency, holding the position from 1952 to 1971. During his administration, Philips solved many of Hillsdale's financial worries and constructed many new campus buildings such as the Koon Student Residence in 1959, the Knorr Student Center (including the Custiss Dining Hall) in 1963 and its adjoining Dow Hotel and Conference Center in 1964, Simpson and McIntyre Student Residences in 1966, and the Strosaker Science Center in 1967. In these years, Hillsdale began to resist Federal civil rights regulations, particularly concerning affirmative action, enacted in the 1960's. In 1962, the college's trustees adopted its own "Declaration of Independence". It affirmed Hillsdale's stance against what it called governmental control.

A marker designating the college as a Michigan Historic Site was erected by the Michigan Historical Commission in 1968.

George Roche III became the 11th president of Hillsdale College in 1971. During the Roche years, Hillsdale became nationally known, in part because of its withdrawal from federal and state-assisted loan programs and grants. Colleges that receive Federal funding are required by law to report data on racial integration as part of the US affirmative action student loan program. Hillsdale announced that it refused to do so, and the college's trustees instead stated that the institution would follow its own non-discrimination policy and "with the help of God, resist, by all legal means, any encroachments on its independence." In 1984, after a decade of litigation, the college withdrew from all federal student loans, replacing government assistance with private contributions.

Roche was highly successful in fundraising, and during his presidency, the college dramatically increased its endowment, established the Center for Constructive Alternatives, and hosted prominent national speakers, including Ronald Reagan. It also began publishing Imprimis, a monthly speech digest. Russell Kirk taught at Hillsdale one semester a year throughout this time, beginning in 1973. During Roche's tenure, 3 new dormitories were built, including the Whitley Student Residence (1989), Niedfeldt Men's Residence (1990), and Benzing Women's Residence (1993), as well as the Sage Fine Arts Building (1992)
and Dow Science Building (1996). He also oversaw expansions to both the old Stock Fieldhouse--now the Roche Sports Complex--in 1989 and the Mossey Library in 1994.

Roche resigned in late 1999, following the scandal surrounding the suicide of his son's wife, Lissa Jackson Roche, who was found shot dead in the college arboretum. Ms. Roche had stated that she and her father-in-law had been engaged in a 19 year long sexual affair. On October 17, 1999, she said that she had engaged in a 19-year on-and-off sexual affair with him. She fatally shot herself at the Slayton Arboretum on campus with a .38-caliber handgun from her husband's gun cabinet. Married to Roche's son, known as Roche IV, Jackson Roche was employed by Hillsdale as the Managing Editor of Imprimis and Hillsdale College Press. President Roche denied the affair. The college's reputation suffered and donations declined markedly.

21st century
Larry P. Arnn has served as president of the college since 2000. He has overseen the dedication of Delp Hall and Moss Hall in 2000 and the construction of Howard Music Hall (2003), the Suites (2005), Lane Hall and Kendall Hall (2005), the Grewcock Student Union (2008), Biermann Athletic Center (2013), the Halter Shooting Sports Center (2019), Christ Chapel (2019), and New Dorm (2020). In 2015, the former Custiss Dining Hall, originally built in 1959, and Phillips Auditorium, were substantially renovated. Student dining service had already moved into the Grewcock Student Union in 2008, so the former Dining Hall became a reception space and Phillips Auditorium was expanded an rededicated as Plaster Auditorium. The new facility became the Searle Center.

In 2010, Hillsdale began the Barney Charter School Initiative focused on supporting the development of classical charter schools across the country. The first schools opened in 2012. Its broader K-12 Initiative developed a full liberal arts K-12 curriculum for use in the charter schools and its private school in Michigan, Hillsdale Academy. In 2021, Hillsdale K-12 released a Civics "1776 Curriculum." In 2022, Hillsdale had schools following its K-12 liberal arts curriculum across 19 states and Barney Charter Schools in 9 states.

After several decades of maintaining a semester program in Washington D.C., Hillsdale established a permanent presence with the establishment of the Allan P. Kirby, Jr. Center for Constitutional Studies and Citizenship on Massachusetts Avenue. The facility was dedicated on Constitution Day 2010. Ginni Thomas, wife of Supreme Court Justice Clarence Thomas, ran the Washington center's speaker series at this time. In 2015, the Boyle Radio Studio at the Kirby Center was dedicated.

In 2012, Hillsdale founded the Van Andel Graduate School for Statesmanship on its Michigan campus offering both an M.A. and PhD in Politics. Its first M.A. students graduated in 2014, and its first PhD students graduated in 2018. In 2020, Hillsdale founded the Van Andel Graduate School of Government on its DC campus offering an M.A. in Government. Its first students graduated in 2022. In 2022, Hillsdale founded its Graduate School of Classical Education offering an M.A. in Classical Education.

In 2013, Arnn was criticized for remarks about ethnic minorities he made while testifying before the Michigan legislature against the Common Core curriculum standards. Expressing concern about government interference with educational institutions, he noted having received a letter from the state Department of Education early in his presidency that said his college "violated the standards for diversity." He added, "because we didn't have enough dark ones, I guess, is what they meant." After being criticized for calling minorities "dark ones," Arnn explained that he was referring to "dark faces". He stated: "The State of Michigan sent a group of people down to my campus, with clipboards ... to look at the colors of people's faces and write down what they saw. We don't keep records of that information. What were they looking for besides dark ones?" Michigan House Democratic Leader Tim Greimel condemned Arnn's comments, calling them "offensive", "inflammatory and bigoted", and asked for an apology. In response, the college issued a statement apologizing for Arnn's remark, while reiterating his concern about "state-endorsed racism", as Arnn called affirmative action. 

In 2019, S. Prestley Blake donated his former home, an exact replica of Thomas Jefferson's Monticello, in Somers, Connecticut to Hillsdale College. In May 2021, Hillsdale dedicated the property as the Blake Center for Faith and Freedom. In November 2021, Hillsdale purchased land in Placer County, California for nearly $6M with plans for a new educational center.

Academics
Hillsdale enrolls approximately 350 new students each year, with a current enrollment of around 1,450 students from 47 states, the District of Columbia, and eight foreign countries. The college employs 124 full-time faculty members. Hillsdale was ranked 46th in the 2022 U.S. News & World Report listing of "National Liberal Arts Colleges". The Princeton Reviews The Best 384 Colleges 2023 ranked Hillsdale as first for "most engaged in community service," seventh for "students love these colleges," eighth for "professors get high marks," and thirteenth for "students study the most." 

Undergraduate offerings include a variety of liberal arts majors, pre-professional programs, a teacher education program, and a journalism certificate program. The most popular undergraduate majors, based on 2021 graduates, were:
Economics (31)
Political Science & Government (31)
English Language & Literature (26)
History (26)
Finance (23)
Biochemistry (20)
Biology/Biological Sciences (20)

The college offers three graduate programs: the Van Andel Graduate School of Statesmanship, offering both an M.A. and a Ph.D. program in Politics; the Steve and Amy Van Andel Graduate School of Government, based in Washington, D.C., and offering an M.A. in Government; and the Graduate School of Classical Education, offering an M.A. in classical education.

Campus

Hillsdale's  campus contains multiple instructional and office buildings, 13 residence halls, seven fraternity and sorority houses, an athletic complex, a library, a music hall, an arts center, a conference center, a hotel, and a preschool. Hillsdale College also operates Hillsdale Academy, a private K–12 liberal arts school. The college opened the classical-style Christ Chapel in 2019, in a dedication ceremony led by Supreme Court justice Clarence Thomas.

The campus features the Liberty Walk, a walkway lined with bronze depictions of famous statesmen including George Washington, Thomas Jefferson, Abraham Lincoln, Frederick Douglass, Winston Churchill, Margaret Thatcher, and Ronald Reagan.

Policies
Hillsdale's charter prohibits discrimination based on race, religion, or sex. Concerning such discrimination, in the early 1980s a controversy over the school's practices threatened federal student loans to 200 Hillsdale students. Title IX prohibits sex-based discrimination in any school or other education program that receives federal money. The federal government required colleges where students received federal funding to document their compliance with Title IX, but Hillsdale refused, arguing that the government could not deny federal funds to its students because the college received no direct federal funding and there was no allegation of actual sex discrimination. The Department of Health, Education and Welfare (HEW) sought to terminate federal financial assistance to Hillsdale's students; an Administrative Law Judge (ALJ) denied HEW's request in 1978, and both HEW and Hillsdale appealed to HEW's Civil Rights Reviewing Authority. 

In October 1979, the Reviewing Authority rejected Hillsdale's arguments and the ALJ's decision, ruling that HEW could require Hillsdale to sign the Assurance of Compliance as a condition of its students receiving federal financial assistance. The college appealed to the United States Court of Appeals for the Sixth Circuit; in 1982, the Sixth Circuit ruled that government aid to individual students could be terminated without a finding that a college actually discriminated, but nevertheless upheld Hillsdale's refusal to sign the compliance forms because only its student loan and grant program is subject to Title IX regulation, not the entire college.

In the related 1984 case Grove City College v. Bell, the Supreme Court required every college or university to fulfill federal requirementspast and future requirementsif its students received federal aid. As a result of the decision, Hillsdale withdrew from all federal assistance beginning with the 1984–85 academic year; Grove City College, the plaintiff in that case, followed Hillsdale's lead four years later. Beginning in the 2007–08 academic year, Hillsdale stopped accepting Michigan state assistance, instead matching with its own aid any funds that a student would have received from the state. Since 2007, Hillsdale's entire operating budget, including scholarships, has come from private funding and endowments.

Programs

Center for Constructive Alternatives

Hillsdale brings speakers to campus through its Center for Constructive Alternatives program. Lectures are open to the public. Speakers have included Stephen Ambrose, Benazir Bhutto, Harry Browne, Russell Kirk, Harvey Mansfield, Charles Murray, Ralph Nader, P.J. O'Rourke, Phyllis Schlafly, and Juan Williams. Lectures and speeches from the series are published monthly in Imprimis, and distributed monthly for free. First published in 1972, Imprimis has a circulation of over five million subscribers.

Barney Charter School Initiative
The college's Barney Charter School Initiative was established to support the launch of K–12 charter schools based on a classical liberal arts model, with a strong civics component to "equip students to understand and defend the principles of the Declaration of Independence and the Constitution."

Hillsdale-Oxford Scholars Program
Through an affiliation with Oxford's Center for Medieval and Renaissance Studies and the Oxford Study Abroad Program, Hillsdale College offers a study abroad program at Oxford University where participants participate in classes and extracurricular as associate members of one of 38 different colleges in the university.

Allan P. Kirby Center

Hillsdale operates the Allan P. Kirby, Jr. Center for Constitutional Studies and Citizenship in Washington, D.C. The Kirby Center provides assistance to Hillsdale students who participate in Washington internships and co-sponsors the James Madison Fellows Program with The Heritage Foundation and the Federalist Society. It engages with senior-level congressional staff members who the college describes as "dedicated to making first principles the foremost consideration in public policy formation". Since 2008, the center has hosted the monthly AWC Family Foundation Lecture Series,which has included lectures by David Horowitz, John Bolton, and Paul A. Rahe. The Kirby Center also hosts an annual Constitution Day celebration and conducts online town halls on matters related to the Constitution.

The Blake Center for Faith and Freedom
In 2019, S. Prestley Blake donated his estate in Somers, Connecticut, to the college. Following a lengthy battle over zoning issues, the college has turned the estate into The Blake Center for Faith and Freedom. The center includes a replica of Thomas Jefferson's Monticello. The college plans on hosting events similar to those held at other campuses in the future. The first event was held on May 20, 2021, with the donation of 200 books for the Jefferson Library.

Academy for Science and Freedom
In December 2021, Hillsdale launched the Academy for Science and Freedom in response to the COVID-19 pandemic. The academy's stated goal is to "educate the American people about the free exchange of scientific ideas and the proper relationship between freedom and science in the pursuit of truth." The academy called the United States' response to the COVID-19 pandemic "the worst public health fiasco in history" that "has unveiled serious issues with how science is administered".  Scott Atlas, Jay Bhattacharya, and Martin Kulldorff, who helped found the academy, have ties to the Great Barrington Declaration.

Campus life

Athletics

The college has a number of sports teams that compete at the NCAA Division II level, including baseball, men's and women's basketball, football, softball, women's swimming, track and field, cross country, men's and women's tennis, and women's volleyball. The college also has club teams and intramural sports that vary from year to year. The Chargers, as the Hillsdale athletics teams are known, compete in the Great Midwest Athletic Conference.

Football coach Frank "Muddy" Waters was the head coach at Hillsdale from 1954 to 1973. The football stadium, Frank Waters Stadium, is named in his honor.

Football

Hillsdale College has sponsored a football team every year since 1891 with the exception of 1943 and 1944 seasons being canceled because of World War II. Their overall program record is 647–438–48 in 128 seasons of play. They split the 1985 NAIA National Championship with Central Arkansas after the game concluded in a 10–10 tie. They have won 34 championships since 1891, their most recent championship-winning the GMAC Conference in 2018. They have had 55 All-American players in program history and 10 All-American Academic players. Hillsdale College competed in the NAIA from its inception until 1990, where it became an NCAA Division 2 institution. Keith Otterbein is the present Hillsdale Football coach. He is in his 19th season, as he became the head coach in 2002. Thirteen players from Hillsdale have been drafted in the NFL, and eleven have been signed as undrafted free agents. Hillsdale has been a part of four different conferences and was also independent at one point. From 1880 to 1960, they were a part of the MIAA. From 1961 to 1974, they were independent. In 1975, they joined the GLIAC until 1989. In 1990, they left the GLIAC to join the MIFC from 1990 to 1998. In 1999, they rejoined the GLIAC conference and remained there until 2017. Now, they stand in the GMAC conference. A few outstanding records from over the years are the program's longest winning streak, 34 in 1954–1957 and Troy Weatherhead holds the record for the highest percentage of passes completed in a season, 76.9%, in the year 2010.

Other sports

In 2018, Hillsdale College was named one of the best schools in the U.S. for student-athletes by Next College Student Athlete's 2018 NCSA Power Rankings. Hillsdale was the fourth ranked school among all NCAA Division II colleges and universities in the U.S. The NCSA Power Rankings, which recognize the best colleges and universities in the U.S. for student-athletes, ranked Hillsdale within the top 10 among all Division II schools for several sports including football, baseball, softball, men's and women's basketball, men's and women's tennis, men's and women's track and field, women's swimming and women's volleyball. Hillsdale men's track and field also ranked 97th overall (among all divisions).

Hillsdale also has a nationally ranked competitive shotgun team. Competing in both the Association of College Unions International and the Scholastic Clay Target Program circuits, the team are seven-time ACUI Collegiate national champions, winning in 2012, 2014–2018, and 2021. It competes in six shotgun shooting disciplines: trap, skeet, sporting clays, and a variation on each.

Greek life
North American Interfraternity Conference Fraternities
 Delta Tau Delta – Kappa Chapter, rechartered in 2007
 Sigma Chi – Alpha Kappa Chapter, rechartered in 1980
 Alpha Tau Omega – Beta Kappa Chapter, 1888
 Delta Sigma Phi – Tau Chapter, 1915

National Panhellenic Conference Sororities
 Kappa Kappa Gamma – Kappa Chapter, 1881
 Pi Beta Phi – Michigan Alpha Chapter, 1887
 Chi Omega – Rho Gamma Chapter, 1924

Alma mater
Hillsdale's alma mater is "White and Blue". The words and melody were composed by Bess Hagaman Tefft, Class of 1937.

Notable people

Notable alumni

Politics and law
 E. Ross Adair (1929), member of the U.S. House of Representatives from Indiana
 Chester Hardy Aldrich (1888), Governor of Nebraska and justice on the Nebraska Supreme Court
 Joseph Cella (1991), United States Ambassador to Fiji
 Chris Chocola (1984), member of the U.S. House of Representatives from Indiana's 2nd congressional district and President of the Club for Growth
 Cyrus Cline (1876), member of the U.S. House of Representatives from Indiana
 David L. Cornwell (1964), member of the U.S. House of Representatives from Indiana
 Dan Crane (1958), member of the U.S. House of Representatives from Illinois's 22nd and 19th congressional districts
 Phil Crane (1952), member of the U.S. House of Representatives from Illinois's 8th congressional district
 Robert William Davis (1952), member of the U.S. House of Representatives from Michigan's 11th congressional district
 Solomon Robert Dresser (1865), member of the U.S. House of Representatives from Pennsylvania and founder and president of S.R. Dresser Manufacturing Co., now Dresser Industries
 Spencer O. Fisher (c. 1865), member of the U.S. House of Representatives from Michigan's 10th congressional district
 Albert J. Hopkins (1870), U.S. Senator from Illinois
 Henry M. Kimball (c. 1900), member of the U.S. House of Representatives from Michigan's 3rd congressional district
 Verner Main (1907), member of the U.S. House of Representatives from Michigan
 Spencer G. Millard (1877), Lieutenant Governor of California
 Joseph B. Moore (1879), justice on the Michigan Supreme Court
 Thomas Morrison (1997), representative for the 54th District in the Illinois General Assembly
 Aric Nesbitt (2001), member of Michigan House of Representatives (2011–2017), 66th district and House Majority Floor Leader; President Pro Tempore of the Michigan State Senate (2019–present)
 Walter H. North (1896), justice on the Michigan Supreme Court
 Jasper Packard (c. 1853), newspaper editor and U.S. Representative from Indiana
 Paul J. Ray, Administrator of the Office of Information and Regulatory Affairs
 David Viviano (1994), justice on the Michigan Supreme Court
 Beth Walker (1987), justice of the West Virginia Supreme Court of Appeals
 Betsy Woodruff Swan (2012) reporter
 Hans Zeiger (2007), author and representative for the 25th Legislative District of Washington

Military and public service
 Clinton B. Fisk (c. 1844), Civil War soldier and statesman, namesake of Fisk University and Prohibition Party candidate for president in 1888; first inductee into the Hillsdale County, Michigan Veteran's Hall of Fame in 2001
 Mary Hannah Fulton (1874), medical missionary in China
 Washington Gardner (1870), Civil War soldier and statesman
 Charles Vernon Gridley (c. 1860), Civil War sailor and Spanish–American War Naval captain
 Moses A. Luce (1866), lawyer and Medal of Honor recipient for service in the Civil War
 Erik Prince (1992), Navy SEAL and founder of Blackwater

Science and engineering
 Bion J. Arnold, pioneer in electrical engineering and mass transportation

Professional sports and athletics
 Andre Holmes (2011), wide receiver for the Denver Broncos
 Jared Veldheer (2010), offensive lineman for the Green Bay Packers
 Tom Heckert (1990), former general manager for the Cleveland Browns
 Spanky McFarland (1976), college baseball coach at Northern Illinois and James Madison
 Ron Tripp (c. 1975), expert in sambo and judo and current general secretary of USA Judo
 Chester Marcol (1972), placekicker for the Green Bay Packers and Houston Oilers
 Chuck Liebrock (1967), offensive lineman in the Canadian Football League for the Toronto Argonauts and Winnipeg Blue Bombers
 Bruce McLenna (1966), halfback for the Detroit Lions and Kansas City Chiefs
 Bud Acton (c. 1964), NBA player with the San Diego Rockets
 Howard Mudd (1963), offensive lineman for the San Francisco 49ers and Chicago Bears and offensive line coach for the Philadelphia Eagles
 Wayne Schurr (1959), relief pitcher for the Chicago Cubs
 Mike Lude (1948), head football coach at Colorado State University and athletic director at Kent State University, University of Washington, and Auburn University
 Fred Knorr (1937), radio executive and part-owner of the Detroit Tigers
 Lynn Bell (1906), minor-league professional baseball player and college football coach
 Amanda Eccleston (2012) Retired professional mid-distance runner for Brooks.

Academia and scholarship
 Manuel Ayau (1973), Guatemalan-born politician, humanitarian, and founder of the "Universidad Francisco Marroquín"
 Clara Kern Bayliss (1871, 1874), first woman to graduate from Hillsdale, became writer, educator
 Elizebeth Friedman (1915), pioneer in cryptology
 Jason E. Hammond, Michigan Superintendent of Public Instruction
 Peter Leeson (2001), economist
 Robert P. Murphy (1998), economist and author
 Gennady Stolyarov II (2008), libertarian and transhumanist writer
 Robert Page Sims (1897), college president, civil rights activist
 Kat Timpf Fox News contributor

Notable faculty

Present faculty
 Michael Anton, former senior national security official in the Trump administration
 Larry P. Arnn, educator and political scientist
 Bradley J. Birzer, history professor and holder of the Russell Amos Kirk Chair in American Studies
 Ronald J. Pestritto, graduate dean and professor of politics
 Paul A. Rahe, historian
 Wilfred McClay, historian and author
 Gary L. Wolfram, economist and public policy analyst
 D. G. Hart, religious and social historian
 Mollie Hemingway, journalist

Visiting faculty and fellows
 Victor Davis Hanson, classicist and war historian
 Mark Helprin, novelist and intelligence expert
 Carl F.H. Henry, theologian
 David McCullough, historian
 Madsen Pirie, British researcher, author, and educator
 Mark Steyn, journalist
 Clarence Thomas, Associate Justice of the Supreme Court of the United States

Past faculty
 Michael Bauman, theologian
 John Jay Butler, Free Will Baptist theologian
 Allan C. Carlson, historian
 Ransom Dunn, dean and professor emeritus
 Clark Durant, educator, Senate candidate, co-founder of Cornerstone Schools (Michigan) and Imprimis
 Richard Ebeling, Austrian School economist
 Burton Folsom, economic historian
 Sir Martin Gilbert, official biographer of Winston Churchill and twentieth-century historian
 Daniel McBride Graham, abolitionist, inventor
 Russell Kirk, conservative writer
 Madsen Pirie, British researcher and former visitor in philosophy and logic
 Frank "Muddy" Waters, College Football Hall of Fame inductee

Notable trustees
 Pat Sajak, Wheel of Fortune host, President of the Hillsdale College Board of Trustees

References

External links

 
 The Hillsdale Collegian, the campus newspaper

 
Liberal arts colleges in Michigan
Educational institutions established in 1844
Education in Hillsdale County, Michigan
Buildings and structures in Hillsdale County, Michigan
Conservatism in the United States
1844 establishments in Michigan
Nondenominational Christian universities and colleges in the United States
Private universities and colleges in Michigan
Free Will Baptist schools
Michigan State Historic Sites